Jean Foster (born October 13, 1972, in Columbus, Georgia) is an American sport shooter. She competed in rifle shooting events at the Summer Olympics in 1996 and 2000.

Olympic results

References

1972 births
Living people
ISSF rifle shooters
American female sport shooters
Olympic shooters of the United States
Shooters at the 1996 Summer Olympics
Shooters at the 2000 Summer Olympics
21st-century American women